Foo-Foo may refer to:

Foo-Foo, a fictional poodle belonging to Miss Piggy on The Muppet Show
Foo Foo, a fictional poodle belonging to Walter the Softy in the Beano 
"Foo Foo", a song by Santana from their album Shaman
Foo-foo band, a nautical term meaning an impromptu musical band on a ship
Foo Foo, a television animation series by Halas and Batchelor Cartoon Films, 1959-1960
 Foo Foo Lammar, a British drag queen and nightclub owner
Fufu, a staple food in much of Africa
Fufu (dog) (1998–2015), the former pet poodle of the Thai Crown Prince

See also
"Little Bunny Foo Foo", a children's poem